is a 1970 Japanese Chambara film directed by Kenji Misumi and starring Shintaro Katsu, who also produced and co-wrote the script. It is the twenty-first of a series of films featuring the blind swordsman Zatoichi. The main character is based on a fictional character, a blind masseur and swordmaster. He was created by novelist Kan Shimozawa and set during the late Edo period (1830s and 1840s).

Zatoichi Goes to the Fire Festival was the last film in the original saga of Zatoichi (1962–1989) directed by Misumi, who had also directed the first film of the series, and several others as well.

Synopsis 

During his wanderings, Zatoichi comes across with a group of people connected with an infamous Yakuza boss, known as "Dark Lord" Yamikubo. Yamikubo is blind like Ichi, but he is indeed evil, and rules with an iron fist a great region of lands and towns who pay tribute to him. After Zatoichi tries to help a woman who has been bought at a "mistress auction" organized by one of Yamikubo's henchmen, the Dark Lord uses the beautiful Okiyo, his protégé, as a spy who must seduce and take Ichi's shikomi-zue (cane sword) away. But shortly after meeting him, Okiyo falls in love with Ichi and refuses to carry out her mission. Yamikubo then devises another way of drawing the blind swordsman close and kill him during the famous "Fire Festival", which Zatoichi decides to attend despite the danger involved.

Cast 
 Shintaro Katsu ... Zatoichi
 Reiko Ōhara ... Okiyo
 Masayuki Mori ... Dark Lord Yamikubo/Lord Yamikubo
 Tatsuya Nakadai ... Ronin
 Kō Nishimura ... Migi
 Ryūnosuke Kaneda ... Boss Kuroko

Production
 Yoshinobu Nishioka - Art direction

Release
Zatoichi Goes to the Fire Festival was released in Japan on August 12, 1970. The film was followed-up with the sequel Zatoichi Meets His Equal.

References

Footnotes

Sources

External links 
 

1970 drama films
1970 films
Films directed by Kenji Misumi
Films scored by Isao Tomita
Japanese drama films
1970s Japanese films